PSU may refer to:

Organizations

Military
Police Support Unit, a paramilitary wing of the Zimbabwe Republic Police
Port Security Unit, a U.S. Coast Guard expeditionary force protection unit

Political parties
Parti Socialiste Unifié (disambiguation), various parties
United Socialist Party (Bolivia), Bolivia (Partido Socialista Unificado)

Universities
Pacific States University
Palawan State University
Pangasinan State University
Papua State University
Partido State University
Pembroke State University
Pennsylvania State University
Pittsburg State University
Plattsburgh State University
Plymouth State University
Portland State University
Prince of Songkla University
Prince Sultan University
Puntland State University

Other organizations
Personal Support Unit, a UK charity assisting individuals in court proceedings
Prudential Staff Union, former trade union in the UK
Public sector undertakings in India, companies owned by government in India

Other uses
Passenger service unit, above each seat in a passenger airplane
Polysulfone, family of high performance thermoplastics
Power supply unit, an electronic device
Power supply unit (computer)
Phantasy Star Universe, a persistent ORPG game by SEGA for PlayStation 2, Xbox 360 and PC
Practical salinity unit, a unit for quantifying a fluid's salinity
Primary sampling unit, in sampling (statistics) 
Program Storage Unit, a chip as used e.g. in the Fairchild F8 microprocessor
Projective special unitary group, a mathematical quotient
Prueba de Selección Universitaria, public university admission test in Chile